Mytilene Municipal Stadium is a multi-use stadium in Mytilene, Greece. It is currently used mostly for football matches and is the home stadium of Aiolikos. The stadium holds 3,000 people, all-seated.

Nickname
Stadium's nickname is Tarlas, which is inspired by the old name of the settlement where the stadium is built. The word is originated from a Turkish word, which means tract or field.

Information
The stadium has five gates. It has also one big stand and track. The stand is separated in five sections, while there are 100 seats for VIP. In 2001 were put projectors and seats have been placed on all the stand. Until then, only a little section of the stand had seats. On the occasion of 2004 Olympic Games, have been more important projects to changing rooms and other rooms below the stand. The stadium radically reconstructed in 2014, in the occasion of promotion of Kalloni to Superleague Greece.

Other events
Concerts are often held here. Famous singers such as Anna Vissi, Sakis Rouvas, Antonis Remos and Michalis Hatzigiannis have played the venue over the years.

References

Football venues in Greece
Multi-purpose stadiums in Greece
1960s establishments in Greece